Tamara Vasilyevna Lazakovich (11 March 1954 – 1 November 1992) was a Soviet artistic gymnast who competed at the 1972 Summer Olympics.

Described as a "perky sparrow" with a "purity of line", Lazakovich was spotted by her compatriot, Olympic champion Larisa Petrik, in 1961 and brought to prominent coaches in the Belarusian system. She showed promise early on, winning several gold and silver medals at the 1968 and 1969 USSR Junior Championships. She debuted as a senior at the 1970 World Artistic Gymnastics Championships. The Soviets won the gold medal in the team competition, but a low score of 8.00 on the balance beam during the compulsory round dropped Lazakovich to 21st place in the individual all-around, the lowest on the Soviet team.

At the 1971 European Championships, Lazakovich tied her teammate Ludmilla Tourischeva—a European, World, and Olympic all-around champion—for the all-around title. She also took two of the four individual event titles (uneven bars and balance beam) and won silver on the other two (vault and floor exercise). In addition to being co-champions in the all-around, she or Tourischeva occupied the gold and silver positions on the podium on all five individual events, keeping Erika Zuchold of East Germany in third place on four out of five of them.

The next year, at the 1972 Olympics, where Tourischeva dominated the all-around and Soviet teammate Olga Korbut stole the crowd's and media's attention with her daring moves and charismatic personality, Lazakovich quietly worked her way onto the individual podium three times, winning the bronze medal in the individual all-around and floor exercise, plus silver on the balance beam behind Korbut. Her four-event total of 38.25 was the highest of any gymnast in the team compulsories segment of the competition.

Lazakovich retired after the Olympics and worked as a gymnastics coach in Vitebsk. She struggled with alcoholism and was imprisoned for several years for larceny. She died at the age of 38 from alcohol-related illnesses.

References

External links

 http://tamara-lazakovich.narod.ru/ (Russian language page dedicated to Lazakovich)
http://www.gymn-forum.net/bios/women/lazakovich.html
http://sport.guardian.co.uk/news/story/0,,1253585,00.html
http://www.gymn-forum.net/Articles/Misc-Lazakovich.html

1954 births
1992 deaths
European champions in gymnastics
Gymnasts at the 1972 Summer Olympics
Medalists at the World Artistic Gymnastics Championships
Olympic gymnasts of the Soviet Union
Soviet female artistic gymnasts
People from Kaliningrad
Olympic medalists in gymnastics
Medalists at the 1972 Summer Olympics
Olympic gold medalists for the Soviet Union
Olympic silver medalists for the Soviet Union
Olympic bronze medalists for the Soviet Union